Roxane Taeymans (born 15 May 1991) is a former Belgian judoka.

She is the silver medallist of the 2018 Judo Grand Prix Tunis in the -70 kg category.

References

External links
 

1991 births
Living people
Belgian female judoka
European Games competitors for Belgium
Judoka at the 2015 European Games
Judoka at the 2019 European Games
21st-century Belgian women